Speed climbing competitions at the 2018 IFSC Climbing World Cup were being held at eight stops. The winners were awarded trophies, and the best three finishers received medals.

At the end of the season an overall ranking was determined based upon points, which athletes were awarded for finishing in the top 30 of each individual event. Bassa Mawem won the men's seasonal title, Anouck Jaubert won the women's seasonal title, and Russian Federation defended its national team title.

Overall Ranking 
An overall ranking was determined based upon points, which athletes were awarded for finishing in the top 30 of each individual event.

Men 
7 best competition results were counted (not counting points in brackets) for IFSC Climbing World Cup 2018.

Women 
7 best competition results were counted (not counting points in brackets) for IFSC Climbing World Cup 2018.

National Teams 
For National Team Ranking, 3 best results per competition and category were counted (not counting results in brackets).

Moscow, Russia (21–22 April)

Men 
75 athletes attended the World Cup in Moscow. Reza Alipour dominated the finals and won with 5.82s against Vladislav Deulin in the final race. Veddriq Leonardo claimed third place after his teammate Hinayah Muhammad false started.

Women 
68 athletes attended the World Cup in Moscow. Anouck Jaubert secured victory after Iuliia Kaplina false started in the final race. After a short rest, Jaubert went for a solo run and matched the world record of 7.32 seconds set by Kaplina in the 2017 World Games in Wrocław, Poland. Elena Timofeeva rounded up the podium in third place after winning a race against Aries Susanti Rahayu.

Chongqing, China (5–6 May)

Men 
62 athletes attended the World Cup in Chongqing. Dmitrii Timofeev won.

Women 
43 athletes attended the World Cup in Chongqing. Aries Susanti Rahayu won.

Tai'an, China (12–13 May)

Men 
68 athletes attended the World Cup in Tai'an. Bassa Mawem won.

Women 
39 athletes attended the World Cup in Tai'an. Anouck Jaubert won.

Villars, Switzerland (6–7 July)

Men 
68 athletes attended the World Cup in Villars. Aleksandr Shikov won.

Women 
53 athletes attended the World Cup in Villars. Anouck Jaubert won.

Chamonix, France (11–13 July)

Men 
83 athletes attended the World Cup in Chamonix. Danyil Boldyrev won.

Women 
62 athletes attended the World Cup in Chamonix. Aleksandra Rudzinska won.

Arco, Italy (27–28 July)

Men 
72 athletes attended the World Cup in Arco. Danyil Boldyrev won.

Women 
50 athletes attended the World Cup in Arco. Iuliia Kaplina won.

Wujiang, China (20–21 October)

Men 
36 athletes attended the World Cup in Wujiang. Both Reza Alipourshenazandifar from Iran and Ludovico Fossali of Italy barely made it out of the opening round with hundredth of seconds results, Aleskandr Shilov of Russia ended Danyil Boldyrev of Ukraine winning streak In the quarterfinal, and Aspar Jaelolo of Indonesia took the gold medal after defeating Alipourshenazandifar in the semi-finals and Fossali in the final race. Alipourshenazandifar claimed third place after besting Aleskandr Shilov of Russia in the small final.

Women 
33 athletes attended the World Cup in Wujiang. Anouck Jaubert outperformed teammate Victoire Andrier of France in the opening race, bested Sari Agustina of Indonesia with a time under 8 seconds in the quarterfinal, and overtook Mariia Krasavina of Russia by less than a second. In the final race, Jaubert was slower than Aries Susanti Rahayu by 0.3s and took silver medal, gold for Aries, and with it secured the speed season title. Iuliia Kaplina took third place after edging out her teammate Mariia Krasavina of Russia.

Xiamen, China (27–28 October)

Men 
35 athletes attended the World Cup in Xiamen. Bassa Mawem won after a tight race against Aspar Jaelolo in the final race. Reza Alipour clinched bronze medal after Dmitrii Timofeev fell in the small final.

Women 
37 athletes attended the World Cup in Xiamen. Aries Susanti Rahayu won after Iuliia Kaplina fell in the final race. Anouck Jaubert took third place after besting Elena Remizova in the small final.

References 

IFSC Climbing World Cup
2018 in sport climbing